Bubble tea (also known as pearl milk tea, bubble milk tea, tapioca milk tea, boba tea, or boba;) is a tea-based drink that originated in Taiwan in the early 1980s. Taiwanese immigrants brought it to the United States in the 1990s, initially in California through regions like Los Angeles County, but the drink has also spread to other countries where there is a large East Asian diaspora population.

Bubble tea most commonly consists of tea accompanied by chewy tapioca balls ("boba" or "pearls"), but it can be made with other toppings as well, such as grass jelly, aloe vera, red bean, or popping boba. It has many varieties and flavors, but the two most popular varieties are pearl black milk tea and pearl green milk tea ("pearl" signifies the tapioca balls at the bottom).

Description

Bubble teas fall under two categories: teas without milk and milk teas. Both varieties come with a choice of black, green, or oolong tea as the base. Milk teas usually include powdered milk or fresh milk, but may also use condensed milk, almond milk, soy milk, or coconut milk.

The oldest known bubble tea drink consisted of a mixture of hot Taiwanese black tea, tapioca pearls, condensed milk, and syrup (Chinese: 糖漿; pinyin: táng jiāng) or honey. Nowadays, bubble tea is most commonly served cold. The tapioca pearls that make bubble tea so unique were originally made from the starch of the cassava, a tropical shrub known for its starchy roots which was introduced to Taiwan from South America during Japanese colonial rule. Larger pearls (Chinese: 波霸/黑珍珠; pinyin: bō bà/hēi zhēn zhū) quickly replaced these.

Today, there are some cafés that specialize in bubble tea production. While some cafés may serve bubble tea in a glass, most Taiwanese bubble tea shops serve the drink in a plastic cup and use a machine to seal the top of the cup with heated plastic cellophane. The method allows the tea to be shaken in the serving cup and makes it spill-free until a person is ready to drink it. The cellophane is then pierced with an oversize straw, now referred to as a boba straw, which is larger than a typical drinking straw to allow the toppings to pass through.

Due to its popularity, bubble tea has inspired a variety of bubble tea flavored snacks such as bubble tea ice cream and bubble tea candy. The high increase of bubble tea demand and its related industry can provide opportunities for possible market expansion. The market size of bubble tea was valued at $2.4 billion in 2019, compared to a market value of $2.2 billion in 2021. The market size of bubble tea is projected to reach $4.3 billion by the end of 2027. Some of the largest  global bubble tea chains include Chatime, CoCo Fresh Tea & Juice and Gong Cha.

Variants

Drink 
Bubble tea comes in many variations which usually consist of black tea, green tea, oolong tea, and sometimes white tea. Another variation, yuenyeung, (Chinese: 鴛鴦, named after the Mandarin duck) originated in Hong Kong and consists of black tea, coffee, and milk.

Other varieties of the drink include blended tea drinks. These variations are often either blended using ice cream, or are smoothies that contain both tea and fruit.

Toppings 

Tapioca pearls (boba) are the most common ingredient, although there are other ways to make the chewy spheres found in bubble tea. The pearls vary in color according to the ingredients mixed in with the tapioca. Most pearls are black from brown sugar.

Jelly comes in different shapes: small cubes, stars, or rectangular strips, and flavors such as coconut jelly, konjac, lychee, grass jelly, mango, coffee and green tea. Azuki bean or mung bean paste, typical toppings for Taiwanese shaved ice desserts, give bubble tea an added subtle flavor as well as texture. Aloe, egg pudding (custard), grass jelly, and sago also can be found in many bubble tea shops. Popping boba, or spheres that have fruit juices or syrups inside them, are other popular bubble tea toppings. Flavors include mango, strawberry, coconut, kiwi and honey melon.

Some shops offer milk or cheese foam on top of the drink, giving the drink a consistency similar to that of whipped cream, and a saltier flavor profile. One shop described the effect of the cheese foam as "neutraliz[ing] the bitterness of the tea...and as you drink it you taste the returning sweetness of the tea".

Ice and sugar level 

Bubble tea shops often give customers the option of choosing the amount of ice or sugar in their drink. Sugar and ice levels are usually specified ordinally (e.g. no ice, less ice, normal ice, more ice), corresponding to quarterly intervals (0%, 25%, 50%, 75%, 100%).

Packaging 
In Southeast Asia, bubble tea is traditionally packaged in a plastic takeaway cup, sealed with plastic or a rounded cap. New entrants into the market have attempted to distinguish their products by packaging it in bottles and other interesting shapes.  Some have even done away with the bottle and used plastic sealed bags. Nevertheless, the traditional plastic takeaway cup with a sealed cap is still the most common packaging method.

Preparation method 

The traditional way of bubble tea preparation is to mix the ingredients (sugar, powders and other flavorants) together using a bubble tea shaker cup, by hand.

Many present-day bubble tea shops use a bubble tea shaker machine. This eliminates the need for humans to shake the bubble tea by hand. It also reduces staffing needs as multiple cups of bubble tea may be prepared by a single barista.

One bubble tea shop in Taiwan, named Jhu Dong Auto Tea, makes bubble tea entirely without manual work. All stages of the bubble tea sales process, from ordering, to making, to collection, are fully automated.

History
Milk and sugar have been added to tea in Taiwan since the Dutch colonization of Taiwan in 1624–1662.

There are two competing stories for the discovery of bubble tea. One is associated with the Chun Shui Tang tea room (Chinese: 春水堂人文茶館) in Taichung. Its founder, Liu Han-Chieh, began serving Chinese tea cold after she observed coffee was served cold in Japan while on a visit in the 1980s. The new style of serving tea propelled his business, and multiple chains serving this tea were established. The company's product development manager, Lin Hsiu Hui, said she created the first bubble tea in 1988 when she poured tapioca balls into her tea during a staff meeting and encouraged others to drink it. The beverage was well received by everyone at the meeting, leading to its inclusion on the menu.  It ultimately became the franchise's top-selling product.

Another claim for the invention of bubble tea comes from the Hanlin Tea Room (Chinese: 翰林茶館) in Tainan. It claims that bubble tea was invented in 1986 when teahouse owner Tu Tsong-he was inspired by white tapioca balls he saw in the local market of Ah-bó-liâu (鴨母寮, or Yamuliao in Mandarin). He later made tea using these traditional Taiwanese snacks. This resulted in what is known as "pearl tea".

On 29 January 2023, Google celebrated Bubble Tea with a doodle.

Popularity 
In the 1990s, bubble tea spread all over East and Southeast Asia with its ever-growing popularity. In regions like Hong Kong, Mainland China, Japan, Vietnam, and Singapore, the bubble tea trend expanded rapidly among young people. In some popular shops, people would line up for more than thirty minutes to get a cup of the drink. In recent years, the mania for bubble tea has gone beyond the beverage itself, with boba lovers inventing various bubble tea food such as bubble tea ice cream, bubble tea pizza, bubble tea toast, bubble tea sushi, bubble tea ramen, etc.

Taiwan
In Taiwan, bubble tea has become more than a beverage, but an enduring icon of the culture and food history for the nation. In 2020, the date April 30 was officially declared as National Bubble Tea Day in Taiwan. That same year, the image of bubble tea was proposed as an alternative cover design for Taiwan's passport.  According to Al Jazeera, bubble tea has become synonymous with Taiwan and is an important symbol of Taiwanese identity both domestically and internationally. Bubble tea is used to represent Taiwan in the context of the Milk Tea Alliance.

Hong Kong 
Hong Kong is famous for its traditional Hong Kong-style milk tea, which is made with brewed black tea and evaporated milk. While milk tea has long become integrated into people's daily life, the expansion of Taiwanese bubble tea chains, including Tiger Sugar, Youiccha, and Xing Fu Tang, into Hong Kong created a new wave for “boba tea”.

China 
Since the idea of adding tapioca pearls into milk tea was introduced into China in the 1990s, bubble tea has increased its popularity. It is estimated that the consumption of bubble tea is 5 times that of coffee in the recent years. According to data from QianZhen Industry Research Institute, the value of the tea-related beverage market in China has reached 53.7 billion yuan (about $7.63 billion) in 2018.  In 2019, the annual sale of bubble tea shops reached as high as 140.5 billion RMB (roughly $20 billion USD). While bubble tea chains from Taiwan (e.g., Gong Cha and Coco) are still popular, more local brands, like Yi Dian Dian, Nayuki, Hey Tea, etc., are now dominating the market.

In China, young people's growing obsession with bubble tea shaped their way of social interaction. Buying someone a cup of bubble tea has become a new way of thanking someone informally. It is also a favored topic among friends and on social media.

Japan 
Bubble tea first entered Japan by the late 1990s, but it failed to leave a lasting impression on the public markets. It was not until the 2010s when the bubble tea trend finally swept Japan. Shops from Taiwan, Korea, China as well as local brands began to pop up in cities, and bubble tea has remained one of the hottest social trends since then. Especially among teenagers, bubble tea has become so commonplace that teenage girls in Japan invented slang for it: tapiru (タピる). The word is short for drinking tapioca tea in Japanese, and it won first place in a survey of "Japanese slang for middle school girls" in 2018. The interest in tapioca tea has been such that a tapioca theme park in Harajuku, Tokyo was open for a limited time in 2019.

Singapore 
Known locally in Chinese as 泡泡茶 (Pinyin: pào pào chá), bubble tea is loved by many in Singapore. The drink was sold in Singapore as early as 1992 and became phenomenally popular among young people in 2001. This soon ended because of the intense competition and price war among shops. As a result, most of the bubble tea shops were closed and bubble tea lost its popularity by 2003. When Taiwanese chains like Koi and Gong Cha came to Singapore in 2007 and 2009, the beverage experienced only short resurgences in popularity. In 2018, the interest in bubble tea rose again at an unprecedented speed in Singapore, as new brands like The Alley and Tiger Sugar entered the market; social media also played an important role in driving this renaissance of bubble tea.

United States
In the 1990s, Taiwanese immigrants began to introduce bubble tea in Taiwanese restaurants in California. Some of the first stand-alone bubble tea shops can be traced to a food court in Arcadia, in Southern California, and Fantasia Coffee & Tea in  Cupertino, in Northern California. Since then, chains like Tapioca Express, Quickly, Lollicup and Q-Cup emerged in the late 1990s and early 2000s, bringing the Taiwanese bubble tea trend to the US. Within the Asian American community, bubble tea is commonly known under its colloquial term "boba".

As the beverage gained popularity in the US, it gradually became more than a drink, but a cultural identity for Asian Americans. This phenomenon was referred to as “boba life” by Chinese-American brothers Andrew and David Fung in their music video, “Bobalife,” released in 2013. Boba symbolizes a subculture that Asian Americans as social minorities could define themselves as, and “boba life” is reflection of their desire for both cultural and political recognition. It is also used disparagingly in the term boba liberal.

Other regions with large concentrations of bubble tea restaurants in the United States are the Northeast and Southwest. This is reflected in the coffeehouse-style teahouse chains that originate from the regions, such as Boba Tea Company from Albuquerque, New Mexico, No. 1 Boba Tea in Las Vegas, Nevada, and Kung Fu Tea from New York City. Albuquerque and Las Vegas have a large concentrations of boba tea restaurants, as the drink is popular especially among the Hispano, Navajo, Pueblo, and other Native American, Hispanic and Latino American communities in the Southwest.

A massive shipping and supply chain crisis on the U.S. West coast, coupled with the obstruction of the Suez Canal in March 2021, caused a shortage of tapioca pearls for bubble tea shops in the U.S. and Canada. Most of the tapioca consumed in the U.S. is imported from Asia, since the critical ingredient, tapioca starch, is mostly grown in Asia.

Australia
Individual bubble tea shops began to appear in Australia in the  1990s, along with other regional drinks like Eis Cendol.  Chains of stores were established as early as 2002 when the Bubble Cup franchise opened its first store in Melbourne.  Although originally associated with the rapid growth of immigration from Asia and the vast tertiary student cohort from Asia, in Melbourne and Sydney bubble tea has become popular across many communities. "you will often see groups of friends of all cultures come together to enjoy bubble tea together". Many suburban shopping centres will have a branch of a bubble tea franchise.

Mauritius 
The first bubble tea shop in Mauritius opened in late 2012 and since then there have been bubble tea shops in most shopping malls on the island. The bubble tea shop became a popular place for teenagers to hang out.

Potential health concerns
In July 2019, Singapore's Mount Alvernia Hospital warned against the high sugar content of bubble tea since the drink had become extremely popular in Singapore. While it acknowledged the benefits of drinking green tea and black tea in reducing risk of cardiovascular disease, diabetes, arthritis and cancer, respectively, the hospital cautions that the addition of other ingredients like non-dairy creamer and toppings in the tea could raise the fat and sugar content of the tea and increase the risk of chronic diseases. Non-dairy creamer is a milk substitute that contains trans fat in the form of hydrogenated palm oil. The hospital warned that this oil has been strongly correlated with an increased risk of heart disease and stroke.

The other concern about bubble tea is its high calorie content, partially attributed to the high-carbohydrate tapioca pearls (or 珍珠), which can make up to half the calorie-count in a 500ml serving of bubble tea.

See also

References

External links
 

Blended tea
Food and drink introduced in the 1980s
Milk tea
Taiwanese drinks
Taiwanese inventions
Taiwanese tea
Tea culture